Bhagwanpur  is a village in Kapurthala district of Punjab State, India. The village is administrated by a Sarpanch who is an elected representative of village as per the constitution of India and Panchayati raj (India).

Demography 
As per Population Census 2011, the Bhagwanpur village has population of  855 of which 432 are males while 423 are females.  The village is administrated by Sarpanch an elected representative of the village.  Literacy rate of Bhagwanpur is 71.77%, lower than state average of 75.84% of Punjab.  The population of children under the age of 6 years is 97 which is 11.35% of total population of Bhagwanpur and child sex ratio is approximately 1021 higher than Punjab average of 846.

As per census 2011, 283 people were engaged in work activities out of the total population of Bhagwanpur which includes 260 males and 23 females. According to census survey report 2011, 91.87% workers describe their work as main work and 8.13% workers are involved in Marginal activity providing livelihood for less than 6 months.

Caste 
The village has schedule caste (SC) constitutes 40.58% of total population of the village and it doesn't have any Schedule Tribe (ST) population.

Population data

Air travel connectivity 
The closest airport to the village is Sri Guru Ram Dass Jee International Airport.

Villages in Kapurthala

External links
  Villages in Kapurthala
 Kapurthala Villages List

References

Villages in Kapurthala district